Banaru (also Romanized as Banārū and Benarow,; also known as Bonāreh) is a village in Pir Sohrab Rural District, in the Central District of Chabahar County, Sistan and Baluchestan Province, Iran. According to the 2006 census, its population was 125, in 26 families.

References 

Populated places in Chabahar County